Anthochoanocotyle is a genus of trematodes in the family Opecoelidae. It consists of one species, Anthochoanocotyle kihobo Kamegai, 1972.

References

Opecoelidae
Plagiorchiida genera
Monotypic protostome genera